Gluhar Hill (‘Halm Gluhar’ \'h&lm glu-'har\) is the ice-covered hill rising to 1054 m in Bevin Glacier on Foyn Coast, Antarctic Peninsula.

The feature is named after the settlement of Gluhar in Southern Bulgaria.

Location
British mapping in 1974.

Maps
 British Antarctic Territory: Graham Land.  Scale 1:250000 topographic map.  BAS 250 Series, Sheet SQ 19–20.  London, 1974.
 Antarctic Digital Database (ADD). Scale 1:250000 topographic map of Antarctica. Scientific Committee on Antarctic Research (SCAR), 1993–2016.

Notes

References
 Gluhar Hill. SCAR Composite Antarctic Gazetteer.
 Bulgarian Antarctic Gazetteer. Antarctic Place-names Commission. (details in Bulgarian, basic data in English)

External links
 Gluhar Hill. Copernix satellite image

Hills of Graham Land
Foyn Coast
Bulgaria and the Antarctic